Abortion in Texas is illegal in most cases. A trigger law has been in effect since August 25, 2022, which bans abortion in all cases except to save the life of the mother.

On September 1, 2021, abortion became illegal in Texas in cases where embryonic cardiac activity can be detected. Before this, elective abortions were allowed up to 20 weeks post-fertilization. In addition to measures passed by the Texas Legislature, there have been anti-abortion efforts at the local level, with 30 Texas cities banning abortion.

When the abortion legislation was introduced as Senate Bill 8, abortion providers described it as a de facto ban on abortions, as it covers abortion once "cardiac activity" in the embryo can be detected, which is earlier than when most women know that they are pregnant.

The only exception for abortions past six weeks is in response to medical emergencies. The law makes no exception for pregnancies resulting from rape or incest. The law can only be enforced through private lawsuits.

The constitutionality of SB 8 is a matter of intense legal controversy. As of September 2021, several legal challenges were pending in state and federal courts.

As of December 2021, medication abortions are permitted only up to seven weeks and the patient must be examined and receive the medication in-person.

Effective July 24, 2022, abortion was outlawed in Texas following the Supreme Court decision Dobbs v. Jackson Women's Health Organization, which overturned the landmark ruling Roe v. Wade, and gave the states the option to outlaw abortion. The State of Texas had a trigger law in place that would automatically ban all abortions in Texas 30 days after Roe v. Wade was overturned.

The only scenario where abortion is permitted is to save the life of a pregnant woman. The state however decided to enforce pre-Roe statutes instead. As of August 25, 2022, the trigger law is in effect as well.

Abortion is decriminalized in the Texas cities of Austin, Dallas, Denton, El Paso, and Houston.

Terminology 
Reflecting its nature and legislative intent, the Texas Heartbeat Act uses the term "unborn child" for the fetus or embryo irrespective of the gestational phase in the definition section: "'Unborn child' means a human fetus or embryo in any stage of gestation from fertilization until birth." Texas Health and Safety Code Sec. 171.201(7).

History

Political support 
One of the largest groups of women strongly tending to oppose legal abortion in the United States is southern white evangelical Christians.

Legislative history 
By the end of the 1800s, every state in the Union except Louisiana had therapeutic exceptions in their legislative bans on abortions. In the 19th century, bans on abortion by state legislatures were concerned with protecting the life of the mother, given the number of deaths caused by abortions. State governments saw themselves as looking out for the lives of their citizens. In 1854, Texas passed an abortion law that made performing an abortion, except in the case of preserving the life of the mother, a criminal offense punishable by two to five years in prison. The law, found in Articles 4512.1 to 4512.4, had a provision stipulating that anyone who provided medication or other means to assist in performing an abortion was an accomplice who could also be charged.

1990s
Following the US Supreme Court ruling in Roe v. Wade in 1973, the State of Texas decided not to repeal abortion laws on the books that had become unconstitutional and unenforceable. A law passed in 1992 said that only Texas-licensed physicians could perform an abortion in the state. A law passed in 1997 gave physicians, nurses, health care provider employees and hospital employees who objected to abortions the ability to refuse to participate directly or indirectly in the procedure. Private hospitals were allowed to refuse the use of their facilities to provide abortion services unless a physician determined that the pregnant woman's life was in immediate danger.

Twenty-one abortion-related bills were introduced in the Texas legislature in 1997. Five were eventually enacted: TX SB 407 (1997), TX SB 1534 (1997), TX HB 1 (1997), YX HB 39 (1997), and TX HB 2856 (1997). TX SB 86 (1997) reached a floor vote but did not pass. TX SB 407 allowed for the Texas Department of Health to suspend the license of an abortion facility if the health and safety of people using the facility were threatened. This bill was introduced by Senator Chris Harris on February 5, 1997, and passed on February 18, 1997, by a voice vote. It then continued to the House, where it passed by a voice vote on April 18, 1997, before being signed into law by Governor George W. Bush on May 1, 1997. TX SB 1534 dealt with funding, stating that no state funding could be used to support, either directly or indirectly, abortion or abortion-related issues. Introduced by Democratic Senator Gonzalo Barrientos on March 20, 1997, the wording about abortion was only added to the legislation during negotiations between the House and the Senate, with the amended version passing both houses in mid-May 1997. TX HB1 said that funds allocated for the Department of Health for family planning services could not be used by the Department of Health or any organizations it provides money to in support of abortion services, either directly or indirectly. This included a proviso that said this was organization-wide, not just as it relates to specific facilities. Representatives Republican McCall, Democrat Leticia Van de Putte, Democrat Gray, Democrat Greenberg and Republican Solomons introduced TX HB39 on January 28, 1997. Originally only about genetic testing with no mention of abortion, the legislation was amended by the Senate, stating that genetic testing of a fetus could not be done on the fetus without the consent of the mother and that the results of any subsequent genetic testing could not be used to compel or coerce a woman into getting an abortion, including having an insurance company threaten the eligibility of health care coverage. These changes were then passed by the House and the bill was signed into law by Governor Bush on June 20, 1997.

TX HB 2856 put in new requirements for abortion clinics, inspection procedures of clinics and a clinic's ability to advertise. It said the Texas Department of Health had to assign each licensed abortion clinic a unique number, clinics needed to have this number in any advertising materials and created a toll-free number people could call to check the status of a clinic's license. Information on the toll-free number had to be provided to women seeking abortion services by the facility offering them at the time of appointment. This law underwent some changes before being passed by voice vote in the House on May 13, 1997, and by a vote of 31 - 0 in the Senate on May 26, 1997. It was signed into law by Governor Bush on June 19, 1997. TX SB 96 reached a floor vote but was eventually removed from consideration following a point of order on May 27, 1997. It would have required minors seeking abortions without parental consent to have the procedure first approved by a physician not located at an abortion clinic certifying the need for the abortion because of physical, sexual or emotional harm caused by continuing the pregnancy. It would have also required minors to wait 48 hours before being able to have an abortion after their physician contacts their parents to notify the parents of approval for the procedure.

2000s
Texas passed a statute requiring parental notification in the early 2000s. This law resulted in a 21% increase in 17-year-old girls seeking abortions in the second trimester. In 2003, the legislature passed a law that required all abortions after 16 weeks take place in an outpatient surgery center and required a 24-hour waiting period before women could get an abortion. Clinics were also required to give women a "Woman's Right to Know" pamphlet which included factually incorrect medical information. In 2005, the 79th Legislature enacted several laws related to abortion. One was a parental consent law. They also passed a "late-term" abortion ban. Other laws dealt with the funding aspects of abortion and family planning, trying to prevent funds for women's reproductive health from going to organizations that provided information about abortions or provided abortion services.

Texas was one of 23 states in 2007 to have detailed abortion-specific informed consent requirements. Statute-required informed consent materials given to women in Texas used graphic and inflammatory language. The law also required the woman to be told how far advanced her pregnancy was. Texas was among states to have passed laws requiring abortion providers to warn patients of a link between abortion and breast cancer and to issue other scientifically unsupported warnings. Informed consent materials given to women seeking abortions in Texas include counseling materials claiming women who have abortions may have suicidal thoughts or experience "post-abortion traumatic stress syndrome." The latter syndrome is not recognized by American Psychological Association or the American Psychiatric Association. Informed consent materials about fetal pain in Texas say the ability of the fetus to feel pain does not exist until 20 weeks, before concluding that it is unknown if a fetus can feel pain at 12 weeks. The legislature tried to pass a "mandatory ultrasound" bill but it failed to pass in 2007.

2010s
As of March 2012, 20 states required women seeking an abortion to have an ultrasound before being allowed to have the procedure. Mandatory transvaginal ultrasounds have been particularly controversial. In Texas, for instance, even if previous ultrasounds had indicated severe birth defects, a woman seeking an abortion was required under a 2012 law to have another ultrasound done, "administered by her abortion doctor, and [she had to] listen to a state-mandated description of the fetus she was about to abort", though state-issued guidelines later eliminated the ultrasound requirement if the fetus had an "irreversible medical condition". In 2013, a state Targeted Regulation of Abortion Providers (TRAP) law was applied to medication-induced abortions and private doctor offices.

An early pregnancy abortion bill was previously introduced in Texas by Representative Phil King on July 18, 2013, in the wake of Rick Perry signing Texas Senate Bill 5 into law. The bill was not passed. Supporters of Texas Senate Bill 5, which included requirements for abortion clinics to meet ambulatory surgical center regulations and for abortion clinic doctors to have hospital admitting privileges, said the bill improved health care for women and babies. Opponents of the bill said it created unnecessary regulations for the purpose of reducing access to abortions. At the time of the bill's signing into law in 2013, only five of the state's forty-two abortion clinics met the law's requirements. Courts had blocked the enforcement of similar laws in some other states, pending lawsuits challenging their constitutionality. A federal district judge determined this law to be unconstitutional, finding that the admitting privileges requirement placed an undue burden on a person seeking to have an abortion; however, this decision was reversed by the Fifth Circuit Court of Appeals, resulting in the immediate closure of all but seven abortion clinics in the state, all of these in urban areas. For patients in Texas's Rio Grande Valley, the nearest clinic was 300 miles away.

While cities like Austin passed legislation to require Crisis Pregnancy Centers (CPCs) to disclose their status and that they did not offer abortion services, organizations representing the CPCs have been successful in courts challenging these laws, principally on the argument that forcing the CPCs to post such language violated their First Amendment rights and constituted compelled speech. While previous attempts at regulating CPCs in Baltimore and other cities were based on having signage that informed the patient that the CPC did not offer abortion-related services, the FACT Act instead makes the patient aware of state-sponsored services that are available rather than what the CPCs did or did not offer. The law went into effect January 1, 2016.

In 2017, Texas was one of six states where the legislature introduced a bill that would have banned abortion in almost all cases. It did not pass. Among those who believe that abortion is murder, some believe it may be appropriate to punish it with death. While attempts to criminalize abortion generally focus on the doctor, Texas state Rep. Tony Tinderholt (R) introduced a bill in 2017 and 2019 that may enable the death penalty in Texas for women who have abortions, and the Ohio legislature considered a similar bill in 2018. On February 7, 2019, Briscoe Cain, a member of the Texas House of Representatives, introduced an early pregnancy abortion bill entitled the Texas Heartbeat Bill. The bill (HB 1500) was joint authored by Representatives Phil King, Dan Flynn, Tan Parker, and Rick Miller. As of February 26, 2019, HB 1500 had 57 sponsors or cosponsors of the 150 members of the Texas House of Representatives. Former State Senator Wendy Davis said HB 1500 is "the most dangerous I've ever seen." In 2019, Texas had some of the most restrictive abortion laws in the country. In mid-May 2019, because of judicial rulings, abortion was effectively banned after week 22.

On June 7, 2019, Texas Governor Greg Abbott signed abortion legislation that was set to go into effect on September 1. This legislation said that local governments could not do business with any organization that provided abortion services, including through the offering of tax breaks or by leasing municipal-owned buildings to such organizations. The legislation also prevents local governments from "advocacy or lobbying on behalf of the interests of an abortion provider or affiliate." An exception was provided for non-abortion clinics that perform fewer than 50 abortions a year, such as doctor offices, hospitals or ambulatory services.

2020s
In May 2021, Texas lawmakers passed the Texas Heartbeat Act, banning abortions as soon as fetal cardiac activity can be detected, typically as early as six weeks into pregnancy and often before women know they are pregnant. In order to avoid traditional constitutional challenges based on Roe v. Wade, the law provides that any person, with or without any vested interest, may sue anyone that performs or induces abortion in violation of the statute, as well as anyone who "aids or abets the performance or inducement of an abortion, including paying for or reimbursing the costs of an abortion through insurance or otherwise." It was signed into law by Governor Greg Abbott on May 15, 2021.

The Heartbeat Act authorizes lawsuits not only against abortion providers, but also against abortion funders, employers, and insurance companies that defray the costs of abortion, along with anyone else who "aids or abets" an unlawful abortion by providing referrals, transportation, or any type of logistical support. Anyone who is successfully sued for violating the Act can be found liable for a minimum of $10,000 for each abortion performed (or assisted) in violation of the Act, plus costs and attorneys' fees.

At the same time, the Act specifically prohibits state officials from enforcing the Act, leaving enforcement entirely in the hands of private litigants who will sue those who violate the statute. The law was written this way to prevent abortion providers from challenging the constitutionality of the statute before it takes effect in the ordinary manner, which involves injunction suits against state officials charged with enforcement in federal court. Instead, abortion providers must wait until someone sues them for violating the statute, and then assert their constitutional claims defensively.

The Act was challenged in courts, but the U.S. Supreme Court declined to enjoin it and no full formal hearing took place before it took effect on September 1, 2021. Whole Woman's Health and other abortion providers sought an emergency injunction from the U.S. Supreme Court to stop the law from coming into effect, but the Court denied the application. Although the order itself was unsigned, Chief Justice John Roberts wrote a dissenting opinion, joined by Justices Stephen Breyer and Elena Kagan, indicating that he would "preclude enforcement of S. B. 8 by the respondents to afford the District Court and the Court of Appeals the opportunity to consider the propriety of judicial action and preliminary relief pending consideration of the plaintiffs' claims." Justice Sonia Sotomayor also wrote a stinging dissent of her own.

On October 6, 2021, U.S. District Judge Robert L. Pitman enjoined Texas courts from participating in the enforcement of the law through private civil litigation on the theory that judges are agents of the state. However, on October 8, 2021, the U.S. Court of Appeals for the Fifth Circuit put the law in effect again.

On December 2, 2021, a new law against medication abortions took effect. The law requires doctors to examine the patient in person before prescribing the pills and makes it a felony for doctors to send the pills to the patient by a delivery service. It also prohibits doctors from prescribing the abortion pill after seven weeks of pregnancy (whereas the U.S. Food and Drug Administration allows it up to 10 weeks). The bill had been previously signed by Governor Greg Abbott.

Judicial history 
In 1971, Norma McCorvey, then an unmarried pregnant woman who would later be known as Jane Roe, decided to challenge the Texas law that said it was a crime for doctors to perform elective abortions and that women could only have abortions if their lives were at stake. The US Supreme Court's decision in 1973's Roe v. Wade ruling meant the state could no longer regulate abortion in the first trimester.  The Supreme Court overturned Roe v. Wade in Dobbs v. Jackson Women's Health Organization,  in 2022.)

On February 19, 1975, the Texas Supreme Court's ruling in the case Jacobs v. Theimer made Texas the first state to declare a woman could sue her doctor for wrongful birth. That case involved Dortha Jean Jacobs (later Dortha Biggs), who caught rubella while pregnant and gave birth to Lesli, who was severely disabled. Dortha and her husband sued her doctor, saying he did not diagnose the rubella or warn them how it would affect the pregnancy.

Low-Income Women of Texas v. Raiford was filed in the Texas District Court on March 10, 1993, to challenge the Texas state constitutionality of denying state funding for abortions when a physician deems the abortion medically necessary.

In 2003, Norma McCorvey filed suit in the U.S. District Court in Dallas with the goal of overturning the Roe v. Wade decision in which she was a participant. In September 2004, a federal appeals court ruled on a Targeted Regulation of Abortion Providers (TRAP) law put into place in Texas law, which ultimately resulted in many abortion clinics in the state being forced to shut down.

On August 29, 2014, US District Judge Lee Yeakel struck down as unconstitutional two provisions of Texas' omnibus anti-abortion bill, House Bill 2 that was to come into effect on September 1. The regulation would have closed about a dozen abortion clinics, leaving only eight places in Texas to get a legal abortion, all located in major cities. Judge Yeakel ruled that the state's regulation was unconstitutional and would have placed an undue burden on women, particularly on poor and rural women living in west Texas and the Rio Grande Valley.

In the case of Whole Woman's Health v. Hellerstedt, the US Supreme Court in a 5-3 decision on June 27, 2016, swept away forms of state restrictions on the way abortion clinics can function. In 2013 the Texas legislature enacted restrictions on the delivery of abortion services, creating an undue burden for women seeking an abortion by requiring abortion doctors to have difficult-to-obtain "admitting privileges" at a local hospital and by requiring clinics to have costly hospital-grade facilities. The Court struck down these two provisions "facially" from the law at issue—that is, the very words of the provisions were invalid, no matter how they might be applied in any practical situation. According to the Supreme Court, the task of judging whether a law puts an unconstitutional burden on a woman's right to abortion belongs with the courts, and not the legislatures.

In August 2018, dilation & evacuation (D & E) legislation passed by Texas and Alabama was working its way through the federal courts' appeal process.

Funding history 
As a result of Administrative Code tit. 25, § 29,1121 from January 1997, women in Texas cannot use any state funds for abortion services unless their life is in danger or the pregnancy is a result of rape. The US 1998 Department of Labor Appropriations Act Pub. L. No 105.78, Title V, §§ 509, 510 was a federal law that barred states who participated in Medicaid from refusing to use federal funds to pay abortions in cases of pregnancy as a result of rape or incest, or when continuing the pregnancy would harm a woman's health.

In 2005 the 79th Legislature enacted several laws related to abortion. One put funding restrictions on family planning clinics as part of legislative efforts to force Planned Parenthood clinics in the state to close. Texas created a state-funded program Alternatives to Abortion Program. Funds for the program came from existing programs designed to support family planning. Additional funding was allocated for the Alternatives to Abortion Program in 2007.

The state legislature continued in its effort to deny funding to Planned Parenthood in 2009. These efforts failed. Another attempt to pass mandatory ultrasounds before women could get abortions also failed. Efforts by lawmakers to try to get Planned Parenthood out of the state continued in 2010. These efforts were successful in defining all Planned Parenthood clinics as abortion clinics, even if a clinic did not perform abortions and only offered family planning services. This was intended to deny Planned Parenthood funding to clinics that didn't provide abortion services. In 2010, the state had three publicly-funded abortion clinics, none of which were state-funded.

In 2011, Texas was one of six states where the legislature introduced a bill that would have banned abortion in almost all cases. It did not pass. In 2011, the state legislature voted to defund family planning funding, including for the Women's Health Program; these programs were replaced by state-funded abortion alternative programs that only provided limited contraceptive supplies. That year, the state also successfully passed a law requiring mandatory ultrasound screenings before women could get abortions. In practice, this led to Planned Parenthood being unable to receive any Title X funding.

The Alternatives to Abortion-supported clinics, many of which have religious affiliations, have not always fared well despite receiving hundreds of thousands of dollars in grants from the state of Texas. Heidi Clinic, run by the Heidi Group, is one such clinic. It opened in April 2018, and staff members engaged in daily prayers while materials around the facility encouraged people to read the Bible and to pray more. It was closed in September 2018 as the clinic served only 5% of the total number of patients they had predicted they would serve. The Heidi Clinic had promised the state they could serve 69,000 people, including men and undocumented immigrants, with their reproductive health services. This was more than the local Planned Parenthood clinic served. The state had several years of documentation showing that the Heidi Group violated contracts and misused taxpayer dollars during a period when the state was funding them and similar organizations. Despite these problems, the State of Texas renewed the contract with the Heidi Group for two additional years. The state was only able to recover a portion of the funding it had allocated to the group for services it failed to provide.

In September 2019, the City of Austin amended its 2020 budget to include $150,000 in funds to support logistical and support services for abortion access. These services could include child care, case management, and transportation needs. The amendment passed with a 10-1 majority supporting the measure, including Mayor Pro Tem Delia Garza who introduced the measure. This was the first measure passed in any U.S. city offering practical support for abortion. A legal challenge to the local policy made its way to the Texas Supreme Court.

Clinic history 

Between 1982 and 1992, the number of abortion clinics in Texas declined by 49, going from 128 in 1982 to 79 in 1992. During a six-year stretch in the 1980s, Carol Everett ran a number of abortion clinics in Austin; she later shuttered these after she had a "come to Jesus" moment.

The state ranked sixth in the total number of abortion clinics lost between 1992 and 1996, dropping by 15 to 64 total clinics. The rate of closures of abortion clinics in Texas increased as more clinics were forced to close because of increased regulatory requirements. In a one-year period, in 2011, 85 abortion clinics closed. Between 2012 and 2016 the number of abortion clinics in Texas dropped from 40 to 19 as a result of the state's House Bill 2, which was struck down by the US Supreme Court in June 2016. After TRAP laws came into effect in Missouri and Texas, women had to travel even greater distances to be able to visit an abortion clinic.

By 2014, there were 28 abortion clinics in the state and 96% of the counties in the state did not have an abortion clinic. That year, 43% of women in the state aged 15 – 44 lived in a county without an abortion clinic. As a result of TRAP legislation passed in 2014, several more abortion clinics in Texas were forced to close. In 2017, there were 35 Planned Parenthood clinics, six of which offered abortion services, in a state with a population of 6,621,207 women aged 15–49. Southwestern Women's Options was one of the abortion clinics open in 2019. A 2019 study found that TRAP laws increased the number of second-trimester abortions by restricting women's access to abortion services.

The passage of legislation regarding local government's ability to do business with abortion service providers on June 7, 2019, impacted Planned Parenthood in East Austin. This was because East Austin had signed a 20-year lease agreement in November 2018 with Planned Parenthood, with the rent being $1 a month. The East Austin clinic was impacted even though it provided no abortion services because its parent organization, Planned Parenthood, did offer such services.

Statistics 
In the period between 1972 and 1974, Texas had the highest illegal abortion death rate in the United States with a rate of 62 deaths per million live births. In the same period, Texas and New York State had the largest number of illegal abortion deaths. Texas recorded 14 deaths in this period while New York had 11 in a period where 63 deaths from illegal abortions were reported nationwide. In 1972, Texas had eight illegal abortion deaths. In 1973, it had five. In 1974, the state recorded one illegal abortion death. In 1990, 2,041,000 women in Texas faced the risk of unintended pregnancy.

The highest number of legal induced abortions by the state in 2000 occurred in New York City with 94,466, while Florida was second with 88,563, and Texas was third with 76,121. In 2001, New York City had the highest number of induced abortions with 91,792, while Florida was second with 85,589, and Texas was third with 77,409. In 2003, the state of New York had the highest number of legal induced abortions with 90,820. Florida was second with 88,247, while Texas was third with 79,166.

In 2012, 73.2% of all abortions were performed in the first trimester, at or before eight weeks. 12.2% of all abortions were performed during week 9 or 10. 1.2% of all abortions occurred between week 17 and week 21. Only 0.5% of abortions occurred after week 21. Most abortions performed in 2012 were done at abortion clinics, accounting for 78.4% of all abortions. The rest were performed either at out-of-state facilities, by physician officers, hospitals or ambulatory surgery centers. The majority of abortions performed in 2012 on Texas residents used the suction aspiration method, accounting for 65.6% of all abortions. The next most common procedure was a medical-non-surgical procedure, accounting for 27.7% of all abortions for Texas residents. The third most common procedure was dilation and evacuation, accounting for 6.6% of abortion procedures.

In 2013, among white women aged 15–19, there were 2,020 abortions, 1,810 abortions for black women aged 15–19, 3,150 abortions for Hispanic women aged 15–19, and 400 abortions for women of all other races.

Public opinion on abortion is divided. In 2014, a poll by the Pew Research Center found that 50% of adults said abortion should be illegal in all or most cases while 45% said it should be legal. In 2017, the state had an infant mortality rate of 5.9 deaths per 1,000 live births.

Illegal abortion deaths 
Texas resident Rosie Jimenez is the first woman known to have died due to an illegal abortion after the Hyde Amendment was passed in 1977. Jimenez died at age 27 in 1977 following an illegal abortion in McAllen, Texas. At the time she was a single mother of a five-year-old daughter as well as a student who would have earned a teaching credential in six months.

Abortion rights views and activities

Organizations 
Jane's Due Process is a Texas-based organization to assist minors going through the judicial-bypass process to secure an abortion without parental consent.

Activities 
Since 1995, the Abortion Access Project has organized Rosie Jimenez Day every October 3. They also sponsor yearly speak-outs and other events in October in memory of Rosie Jimenez.

Protests 
People from Texas participated in marches supporting abortion rights as part of a #StoptheBans movement in May 2019. On May 23, 2019, women gathered at the Texas State Capitol Rotunda in Austin to express opposition to SB8. They dressed in red costumes evoking characters in The Handmaid's Tale.

Anti-abortion views and activities

Organizations 
Human Coalition is a Texas anti-abortion organization that operates crisis pregnancy centers.

Violence 

There was an arson attack in 1980 at an abortion clinic in Texas. It caused around US$320,000 in damage. 1998 saw six arson attacks, four bombings, one murder and 19 acid attacks take place at abortion clinics across the United States. Butyric acid attacks took place between May and July in Florida, Louisiana and Texas.

In 2000, an act of violence took place at an abortion clinic in Eastland County, Texas. Harris County, which includes Houston, has been home to the most anti-abortion violence in the United States as of 2000 with 10 acts of violence being experienced by clinics. A package left at a women's health clinic in Austin, Texas, on April 25, 2007, contained an explosive device capable of inflicting serious injury or death. A bomb squad detonated the device after evacuating the building. Paul Ross Evans (who had a criminal record for armed robbery and theft) was found guilty of the crime.

City ordinances

Anti-abortion ordinances 
As of December 14, 2021, 39 cities in Texas had outlawed abortion within their city boundaries and declared themselves "sanctuary cities for the unborn." The first city to do so was the city of Waskom, Texas, which enacted its local abortion ban on June 13, 2019.

The city of Lubbock enacted its local abortion ban through a referendum on May 1, 2021. Planned Parenthood of Greater Texas was performing abortions in Lubbock when the ordinance was adopted and sued the city in an attempt to block the ordinance from taking effect. A federal district court dismissed the lawsuit on June 1, 2021, ruling that Planned Parenthood lacked standing to sue the city because the ordinance would be enforced solely through private civil lawsuits rather than by city officials. In response to this ruling, Planned Parenthood ceased performing abortions in Lubbock and complied with the ordinance.

Abortion decriminalization ordinances 
As of September 27, 2022, at least five cities in Texas have decriminalized abortion within their city limits. The first city to do so was Houston, which enacted its decriminalization ordinance on May 10, 2022. The Denton City Council decriminalized abortion a week after the Dobbs vs. Jackson decision, on June 29, 2022. On July 21, 2022, the state capital of Austin followed suit. On August 3, 2022, the cities of Dallas and El Paso also decriminalized abortion.

References 

Texas
Healthcare in Texas
Women in Texas